John Moore, 1st Baron Moore PC (c. 1676 – 8 September 1725), was an Irish politician.

Moore was the son of Thomas Moore and Ellen Colley, daughter of Dudley Cowley, Member of Parliament for Philipstown. He was returned to the Irish Parliament for Philipstown in 1703, a seat he held until 1713, and then represented King's County between 1713 and 1715. He was sworn of the Irish Privy Council in August 1715 and raised to the Peerage of Ireland as Baron Moore, of Tullamore in the King's County, in October of the same year.

Lord Moore married firstly Mary Lum, daughter of Elnathan Lum, in 1697. After his first wife's death he married secondly  Elizabeth Sankey, daughter of John Sankey. He died in September 1725 and was succeeded in the barony by his son from his first marriage, Charles, who was created Earl of Charleville in 1758.

References

1725 deaths
Barons in the Peerage of Ireland
Peers of Ireland created by George I
Members of the Privy Council of Ireland
Year of birth uncertain
Irish MPs 1703–1713
Irish MPs 1713–1714
Members of the Parliament of Ireland (pre-1801) for King's County constituencies
1670s births